Buldon, officially the Municipality of Buldon (Maguindanaon: Ingud nu Buldon; Iranun: Inged a Buldon), is a 4th class municipality in the province of Maguindanao del Norte, Philippines. According to the 2020 census, it has a population of 39,684 people.

The town was part of the province of Shariff Kabunsuan from October 2006 until its nullification by the Supreme Court in July 2008.

Geography

Barangays

Buldon is politically subdivided into 15 barangays.
 Ampuan
 Aratuc
 Cabayuan
 Calaan (Poblacion)
 Karim
 Dinganen
 Edcor (Gallego Edcor)
 Kulimpang
 Mataya
 Minabay
 Nuyo
 Oring
 Pantawan
 Piers
 Rumidas

Climate

Demographics

Economy

References

External links
 Buldon Profile at the DTI Cities and Municipalities Competitive Index
 [ Philippine Standard Geographic Code]
 Philippine Census Information
 Local Governance Performance Management System

Municipalities of Maguindanao del Norte